The Dispatch is an American, English language daily newspaper published in Lexington, North Carolina. The newspaper is published Tuesday through Saturday with no Sunday or Monday editions.

History
The Dispatch began publication in 1902, succeeding the weekly Davidson Dispatch (1882–1902), founded by T.B. Eldridge. The paper increased to semi-weekly publication in 1919 and to a six-day-a-week schedule on September 6, 1948. On September 1, 2008 the publication eliminated its Monday edition and was published only five days.

The New York Times Company acquired The Dispatch in 1973, and the Halifax Media Group acquired it on January 6, 2012. In 2015, Halifax was acquired by New Media Investment Group.

In November of 2022 Paxton Media Group acquired The Dispatch and five other North Carolina newspapers from Gannett Co., Inc.

Estimated average circulation of The Dispatch in 2013 was 6,892.

The Dispatch is a member of the North Carolina Press Association.

See also
 List of newspapers in North Carolina

References

External links
 

Publications established in 1902
Davidson County, North Carolina
Daily newspapers published in the United States
Gannett publications
Daily newspapers published in North Carolina
1902 establishments in North Carolina